Key Club Recording is a recording facility founded in Benton Harbor, Michigan by musicians and recording engineers Bill Skibbe and Jessica Ruffins in 2002. The studio has been host to such bands as The Kills, The Fiery Furnaces and others. In January 2013, The Black Keys recorded tracks for their album Turn Blue at the studio after The Kills suggested using it.

Studio layout
The studio itself consists of four acoustically isolated playing rooms, two live and two dead. The Key Club offers 2", 24 track and 16 track recording as well as Pro Tools HD.

Console
Key Club's mixing console is a custom Flickinger N-32 Matrix originally built for Sly Stone. The console was installed in Stone's Bel Air mansion in 1970, in time to record his hit record There's a Riot Goin' On. Later albums, Fresh and Small Talk, were also tracked on the console.

References

External links

KeyClubRecording.com is The Key Club's home webpage.

Music venues in Michigan
Recording studios in the United States
Benton Harbor, Michigan